The 2016 Russia Open Grand Prix is the 15th Grand Prix Gold and Grand Prix tournament of the 2016 BWF Grand Prix Gold and Grand Prix. The tournament was held in Sports Hall Olympic, Vladivostok, Russia from October 4 until October 9, 2016, and had a total purse of 55,000.

Men's singles

Seeds

 Zulfadli Zulkiffli (champion)
 Brice Leverdez (second round)
 Misha Zilberman (second round)
 Vladimir Malkov  (semifinals)
 Artem Pochtarev  (quarterfinals)
 Sourabh Varma  (withdrew)
 Sergey Sirant (quarterfinals)
 Zulhelmi Zulkiffli (quarterfinals)

Finals

Top half

Section 1

Section 2

Bottom half

Section 3

Section 4

Women's singles

Seeds

  Natalia Perminova (semifinals)
  Ksenia Polikarpova (semifinals)
 Tanvi Lad (quarterfinals)
 Gadde Ruthvika Shivani (champion)

Finals

Top half

Section 1

Section 2

Bottom half

Section 3

Section 4

Men's doubles

Seeds

 Vladimir Ivanov / Ivan Sozonov (champion)
 Konstantin Abramov / Alexandr Zinchenko (final)
 Gennadiy Natarov / Artem Pochtarev (first round)
 Orkhan Qalandarov / Kanan Rzayev (first round)

Finals

Top half

Section 1

Bottom half

Section 2

Women's doubles

Seeds

 Anastasia Chervyakova  / Olga Morozova (champion)
 Ekaterina Kut / Daria Serebriakova (first round)

Finals

Top half

Section 1

Bottom half

Section 2

Mixed doubles

Seeds

 Evgenij Dremin / Evgenia Dimova (semifinals)
 Pranaav Jerry Chopra / N. Sikki Reddy (champion)
 Alexandr Zinchenko / Olga Morozova (quarterfinals)
 Andrey Parakhodin / Anastasia Chervyakova (quarterfinals)

Finals

Top half

Section 1

Section 2

Bottom half

Section 3

Section 4

References

External links 

  Международный турнир «Russian Open 2016 at www.badm.ru

Russian Open (badminton)
BWF Grand Prix Gold and Grand Prix
Russian Open Grand Prix